The 2011–12 winter transfer window for English football transfers opened on 1 January and will close on 31 January. Additionally, players without a club may join at any time, clubs below Premier League level may sign players on loan at any time, and clubs may sign a goalkeeper on an emergency loan if they have no registered goalkeeper available. This list includes transfers featuring at least one Premier League or Football League Championship club which were completed after the end of the summer 2011 transfer window and before the end of the 2011–12 winter window.

Transfers

 Player officially joined his club on 1 January 2012.

Notes and references
General

Specific

Transfers Winiter 2011-12
Winter 2011-12
English